Jacques Dorion (ca 1797 – December 29, 1877) was a doctor and political figure in Lower Canada.

He was born at Quebec City around 1797 and studied at the Petit Séminaire de Québec. Dorion studied medicine at Paris and returned to set up practice at Saint-Ours. In 1824, he married Catherine-Louise Lovell, niece of seigneur Charles-Louis-Roch de Saint-Ours. Dorion was elected to the Legislative Assembly of Lower Canada for Richelieu in 1830 and was reelected in 1834, as a supporter of the parti patriote. Dorion signed the Ninety-Two Resolutions. He founded a branch of the Saint-Jean-Baptiste Society at Saint-Ours in 1835. In December 1837, he was arrested for high treason and imprisoned until March 1838.

He died at Saint-Ours in 1877.

One son, Joseph-Adolphe, later served in the Quebec legislative assembly, and another son, Eugène-Philippe, was head of the French translators for the Canadian House of Commons.

External links

Members of the Legislative Assembly of Lower Canada
1797 births
1877 deaths